Žamila (also Zhamila, Jamila, Djamila) Andžela Kolonomos (June 18, 1922 – June 18, 2013) was a Sephardi Jewish freedom fighter, writer, academic, and political activist in what is now North Macedonia.

During the Bulgarian occupation of her home city of Monastir, Kolonomos joined the anti-fascist Yugoslav Partisan resistance. After fighting to liberate Macedonia, she returned to Monastir to find her entire family had been killed in an extermination camp. She moved to the capital, where she became a professor at the Ss. Cyril and Methodius University of Skopje and worked to preserve the language and history of the country's Jewish community.

Early life 
Žamila Kolonomos was born in 1922 in Monastir, now Bitola, North Macedonia. She grew up in the Jewish community in the city, where her father was a bank manager. Her parents, Isak and Esterina Fransez Kolonomos, had five children. Her father was descended from Romaniote Jews. The Kolonomos family was not very religious, although they celebrated the Jewish holidays. Living in a multicultural region, the family spoke Ladino, Greek, French, Serbian, and Turkish.

In her teens, Kolonomos studied at the French school in Bitola beginning in 1940. She was a member of the Socialist-Zionist youth organization Hashomer Hatzair.

World War II 
In 1941, Germany and then Bulgaria occupied Yugoslav Macedonia, including Monastir. At age 19, shortly after the occupation began, Kolonomos joined the Yugoslav Partisans, the Communist resistance to the Axis occupation. This was with the encouragement of her father, who saw it as a way for her to protect herself; her mother had died earlier that year of a heart attack.

She had already been involved in anti-fascist efforts through Hashomer Hatzair, making shoes for resistors and collecting weapons. She helped found underground resistance groups for women and youths.

As Monastir's Jews were rounded up and deported in March 1943, Kolonomos and several other Jewish resisters managed to escape by hiding in a cigarette kiosk. She fled the city and joined the Damyan Gruev detachment of the Partisan Army the following month. Monastir's Jewish community was nearly completely wiped out. Kolonomos lost 18 members of her family, including her father, grandparents, and siblings, who were sent to the Treblinka extermination camp. She was the only member of her immediate and extended family to survive the Holocaust.

Fighting under the nom de guerre Tsveta, she eventually rose to the rank of commissar for several battalions, then was named deputy commissar of a Macedonian brigade and of the 42nd Yugoslav Division. She also edited the detachment's newspaper.

After nearly dying of starvation in the winter of 1943–1944, Kolonomos was hit by an exploding shell and wounded in the back during the battle to liberate Debar the following August. She survived, and the Macedonia region was fully liberated in November 1944.

Postwar period 
After the liberation of Macedonia, she married fellow freedom fighter Čede Filipovski Dame, who had saved her life on several occasions, in December 1944. Her new husband died in a motorcycle accident in June 1945; Kolonomos gave birth to their daughter, Mira, a month later.

She moved to the capital, Skopje, in late 1945, after having learned of the deaths of her family members. There, she married , who had also survived the occupation of Bitola, in June 1947. The couple had a son, Samuel, and were married until his death in 2007. However, tragedy struck again in 1963 when Kolonomos lost her 18-year-old daughter, Mira, in the Skopje earthquake.

In the years after the war, she received several national medals in recognition for her wartime service in the resistance, including the Commemorative Medal of the Partisans of 1941. She continued to be involved in political activism, including through the Alliance of Yugoslav Resistance, the Union for the Protection of Childhood of Macedonia, and the Alliance of Anti-Fascist Women of Macedonia. She served as president of the Union of Women's Associations, the War Veterans' Union, and various other groups. In 1956, she traveled to China in a delegation to represent Yugoslavia, meeting with Mao Zedong.

Kolonomos served as a deputy in the National Assembly of the Socialist Republic of Macedonia, and as a member of the Council of the Republic of Macedonia until her retirement.

Academic career and writing 
Kolonomos received a doctorate in Ladino from Ss. Cyril and Methodius University of Skopje in 1961, and she became a professor in Romance philology there in 1962. She also studied at the Sorbonne in this period.

She wrote and edited various articles and books on the region's history, Ladino, and the Yugoslav-Macedonian resistance during World War II. This notably includes The Jews in Macedonia during the Second World War (1941-1945), originally published in 1986 in Macedonian, co-written with Vera Veskoviḱ-Vangeli.

In the 1970s, she published two collections on Sephardi Jewish language, culture, and history: Poslovice i izreke sefardskih Jevreja Bosne i Hercegovine, which discusses Bosnia and Herzegovina, and Poslovice, izreke i priče sefardskih Jevreja Makedonije, on Macedonia. She is considered the only collector of linguistic and cultural heritage of Macedonian Jews in this period.

Her 2006 memoir Monastir sin Djudios was published in English translation as Monastir Without Jews: Recollections of a Jewish Partisan in Macedonia in 2008. Subsequently, her 2007 memoir of the resistance Dviženjeto na otporot i Evreite od Makedonija was translated into English in 2013 under the title The Resistance Movement and the Jews From Macedonia.

Her books were frequently published in Ladino as well as Macedonian.

Death and legacy 
Žamila Kolonomos died in Skopje in 2013, at age 91.

Her work represents some of the only firsthand accounts of Jewish life and the Holocaust in what is now North Macedonia. A collection of her photographs, documents, medals, and other objects is held by the United States Holocaust Memorial Museum.

Selected works 

 Poslovice i izreke sefardskih Jevreja Bosne i Hercegovine (1976)
 Poslovice, izreke i priče sefardskih Jevreja Makedonije (1978)
 Evreite vo Makedonija vo Vtorata svetska vojna, 1941-1945 (with Vera Veskoviḱ-Vangeli, 1986)
 Sefardski odglasi: Studii i sekavanyaza evreite od Makedoniya (1995)
 Monastir sin Djudios (2006)

References

External links 

 The Žamila Kolonomos collection at the United States Holocaust Memorial Museum

1922 births
2013 deaths
People from Bitola
Macedonian women writers
Academic staff of the Ss. Cyril and Methodius University of Skopje
Macedonian Jews
Macedonian communists
Women in the Yugoslav Partisans
Yugoslav Partisans members
Jews in the Yugoslav Partisans
Jewish women writers
Hashomer Hatzair members
Judaeo-Spanish-language writers
European Sephardi Jews